German submarine U-881 was a Type IXC/40 U-boat of Nazi Germany's Kriegsmarine during World War II. The ship was ordered on 2 April 1942, laid down on 7 August 1943, and launched on 4 March 1944. She was commissioned into the Kriegsmarine under the command of Kapitänleutnant Dr. Karl-Heinz Frischke (Crew 36) on 27 May 1944. Initially assigned to the 4th U-boat Flotilla, she was transferred to the 33rd U-boat Flotilla on 1 March 1945.

Design
German Type IXC/40 submarines were slightly larger than the original Type IXCs. U-881 had a displacement of  when at the surface and  while submerged. She had two shafts and two  propellers.

U-881 was fitted with six  torpedo tubes (four fitted at the bow and two at the stern), 22 torpedoes, one  SK C/32 naval gun, 180 rounds, and a  Flak M42 as well as two twin  C/30 anti-aircraft guns. The boat had a complement of forty-eight.

Service history
For her first patrol, U-881 was assigned to operate in US coastal waters with wolfpack Seewolf.
During this operation U-881 was depth charged and sunk by the American destroyer escort  on 6 May 1945 in one of the last actions in American waters of the Atlantic campaign.
She sank at position  with the loss of all 54 men on board.

References

Bibliography

Clay Blair : Hitler's U-Boat War [Volume 2]: The Hunted 1942–1945 (1998)  (2000 UK paperback ed.)

External links

German Type IX submarines
U-boats commissioned in 1944
World War II submarines of Germany
U-boats sunk in 1945
Ships lost with all hands
U-boats sunk by depth charges
U-boats sunk by US warships
World War II shipwrecks in the Atlantic Ocean
1944 ships
Ships built in Bremen (state)
Maritime incidents in May 1945